The Siberian shrew (''Crocidura sibirica') is a species of mammal in the family Soricidae. It is found in Russia, and possibly China and Mongolia.

References

 Insectivore Specialist Group 1996.  Crocidura sibirica.   2006 IUCN Red List of Threatened Species.   Downloaded on 30 July 2007.

Crocidura
Mammals described in 1930
Taxonomy articles created by Polbot